The Academy of Sedan (Fr.: Académie de Sedan) was a Huguenot academy in Sedan in the Principality of Sedan, founded in 1579 and suppressed in 1681.  It was one of the main centres for the production of Reformed pastors in France for a hundred years.

History

The Academy of Sedan was modeled on the Academy of Geneva (which is today the University of Geneva), which was founded by John Calvin in 1559.  It was organized by the efforts of Françoise de Bourbon-Vendôme, Princess of Sedan, daughter of Louis III de Bourbon, Duke of Montpensier and wife of Henri-Robert de La Marck, Prince of Sedan (the first Prince of Sedan) in 1579.  It was initially known as the College of Sedan (Collège de Sedan).  In 1601, the National Synod of the Reformed Church of France, meeting in Jargeau, voted to transform the College of Sedan into its Academy for the training of pastors.  The Academy of Sedan was suppressed in 1681 as part of Louis XIV's anti-Protestant measures that would climax in the 1685 Edict of Fontainebleau.

Famous Professors

Before the Organization of the Academy

 Mathieu Béroalde, professor of Hebrew, 1573–74
 Louis Cappel de Montgemberg, professor of Theology, 1576
 Immanuel Tremellius, professor of Hebrew, 1576–79
 Austrius Calabrinus, professor of Philosophy, 1579
 Jacques Cappel, professor of Hebrew, 1594
 Moïse Quadratus, professor of physics, 1594
 Robert de Visme, professor of philosophy, 1594
 Giulio Pace, professor of Law, 1595

Professors of Law (one chair)

 Augustin Caillet, 1608–24
 Charles Bordelius, 1624–30
 Jean Daubert, 1630–44
 Claude Pithoys, 1663
 J. J. Burkhart, 1673–75
 Pierre Billot, 1675

Professors of Greek (one or two chairs depending on the time)

 Toussaint Berchet, 1602-24 (Berchet played a large role in the organization of the Academy in 1601)
 Didier Héraut, 1602
 Gautier Donaldson, 1603–09
 Samuel Néran, 1608–11
 Jacob Roussel, 1614
 Jean Brazi, 1629–51
 José Le Vasseur, 1646–71
 Jacques Du Rondel, 1654

Professors of Hebrew (one chair)

 Jacques Cappel, 1602–24
 Jean Huttenius, 1613
 Alexandre Colvill, 1619–43
 Abraham Rambour, 1620–51
 Josué Levasseur, 1646–61
 Abraham Colvill, 1661–67
 Pierre Jurieu, 1674–81

Professors of Theology (three chairs)

 Daniel Tilenus, 1602–19
 Jacques Cappel, 1602–24
 Aaron Blondel, 1603–05
 André Melvin, 1611–19
 Abraham Rambour, 1620–54
 Pierre Du Moulin, 1621–58
 Samuel Maresius, 1625–36
 Alexandre Colvill, 1619–43
 Louis Cappel, 1633–58
 Le Blanc de Beaulieu, 1645–75
 Abraham Colvill, 1658–67
 José Le Vasseur, 1646–71
 Alpée de Saint-Maurice, 1660–81
 Paul Joly, 1673–76
 Henri Sacrelaire, 1676–81
 Pierre Jurieu, 1673–81
 Pierre Trouillard, 1676–80
 Jakob Abbadie, 1680–81

Professors of Philosophy (two chairs)

 John Cameron, 1602–04
 Arthur Johnston, 1606–23
 Claude Pithoys, 1633–75
 Joseph Pithoys, 1655
 Adam Steuart, 1622–28
 P. Bisterfeld, 1624–26
 Alexandre Colvill, 1627–46
 Étienne Brazi, 1661–81
 Pierre Jurieu, 1671–81
 Pierre Bayle, 1675–81

Professors of Rhetoric (Latin) (one chair)

 Jean Brazi, 1664
 Jacques Du Rondel, 1664–81

Professors of Mathematics (one chair)

 Jean de Vesle, 1605
 Richard Doussert, 1613
 Abraham Colvill, 1661–67

Professors of Physics (one chair)

 Gautier Donaldson, 1608
 Abraham Du Han, 1640–53
 Alexandre Colvill, 1619–43

Directors of Military Exercises

 De Saint-Martin 1613
 Du Gast 1680
 Baron 1681
 Legrand 1681-1685
 also influential was the engineer Jean Errard, who taught in the military academy

Famous Alumni

 Nicolas Antoine
 Jacques Basnages
 Samuel Bochart
 Abraham de Moivre
 Pierre Du Moulin
 Charles Drelincourt
 Nicasius le Febure
 Jacques Le Paulmier de Grentemesnil
 Jacques Moisant de Brieux
 Charles de Sainte-Maure, duc de Montausier
 Pierre Du Prat
 Simon Gaschier
 the nephews of Henri de La Tour d'Auvergne, Duke of Bouillon and Countess Elisabeth of Nassau:
the sons of Countess Louise Juliana of Nassau: Frederick V, Elector Palatine and his younger brother Ludwig Philipp of Pfalz-Simmern-Kaiserslautern
the son of John VII, Count of Nassau-Siegen: William, Count of Nassau-Siegen
Joachim Sigismund of Brandenburg, son of John Sigismund, Elector of Brandenburg

References
 Charles Peyran, Histoire de l'ancienne Académie réformée de Sedan, thèse présentée à la faculté de théologie protestante, 22 juin 1846, Strasbourg : Veuve Berger-Levrault, 1846 , 58 p.
 Extraits de la Chronique du Père Norbert concernant le Collège de Sedan, dans Revue historiques des Ardennes, Mézières : Edmond Sénemaud/impr. F. Dervin, 1867, vol.5, pp. 39–64 , puis pp. 166–187 
 Pierre-Daniel Bourchenin, Étude sur les académies protestantes en France au XVIe et au XVIIe siècle (Paris: Grassart, 1882).
 Pierre Congar, Jean Lecaillon et Jacques Rousseau, Sedan et le pays sedanais, vingt siècles d’histoire (Paris: Guénégaud, 1969; Marseille: Laffitte Reprints, 1978)

This article was based on this article on French Wikipedia.

Educational institutions established in the 1600s
Reformed church seminaries and theological colleges
Defunct universities and colleges in France
1601 establishments in France
1681 disestablishments in Europe